The 1924 Massachusetts gubernatorial election was held on November 4, 1924.

Incumbent Republican Lieutenant Governor Alvan T. Fuller was elected over Boston mayor James Michael Curley.

Republican primary

Governor

Candidates

Declared
Alvan T. Fuller, incumbent Lieutenant Governor
James Jackson, Treasurer and Receiver-General of Massachusetts

Results

Lieutenant Governor

Candidates

Declared
Frank G. Allen, State Senator from Norwood

Results
Allen was unopposed for the Republican nomination.

Democratic primary

Governor

Candidates

Declared
James Michael Curley, Mayor of Boston

Results
Curley was unopposed for the Democratic nomination.

Lt. Governor

Candidates

Declared
Thomas J. Boynton, former Massachusetts Attorney General and Mayor of Everett
John J. Cummings, candidate for Lieutenant Governor in 1922
William A O'Hearn, State Senator from North Adams

Results

Independents and third parties

Socialist
Walter S. Hutchins, perennial candidate

Socialist Labor
James Hayes, perennial candidate

Workers
John J. Ballam, Marxist activist and trade union organizer

General election

Results

See also
 1923–1924 Massachusetts legislature

References

Bibliography

Governor
1924
Massachusetts
Massachusetts gubernatorial election